General elections were held in Guam on 4 November 2008. Voters in Guam chose their non-voting delegate to the United States House of Representatives, as well as members of the territorial legislature. The election coincided with the 2008 United States elections.

United States President Straw Poll 
According to tradition, Guam voiced its opinion on the 2008 US Presidential race, despite lacking electoral votes.  Senator Obama received 20,119 votes (57.3%) to Senator McCain's 11,941 (34.0%), marking a change from the island's support of past Republican presidents, including Bush's two straw poll victories.

United States House of Representatives 

Incumbent Delegate Madeleine Bordallo (D) was running unopposed for re-election for Guam's lone At-large congressional seat. She was re-elected unopposed.

Legislature of Guam 

There are 26 candidates vying for the 15 seats in the Legislature of Guam.  The Democratic Party gained full control of the legislature with 10 seats, while the Republican Party gaining only five seats.

References

External links 
 Pacific Magazine: Democrats Gain 'Super Majority' In Guam Legislature

2008 Guam elections